Sara Shepard (born April 8, 1977) is an American author. She is known for the bestselling Pretty Little Liars and The Lying Game book series, both of which have been turned into television shows on Freeform.

Early and personal life 
Shepard grew up with a sister named Alison. She graduated from Downingtown High School in Downingtown, Pennsylvania in 1995. She attended New York University, where she graduated with a B.S. degree in 1999 and an MFA in Creative Writing from Brooklyn College in 2004. From 2000 to 2005, Shepard worked at Time, Inc. Custom Publishing and produced lifestyle magazines for corporate clients. She started ghostwriting as a freelancer in 2002 and writing her own books in 2005.

Shepard currently resides in Pittsburgh, Pennsylvania.

Television shows 
Shepard's book series Pretty Little Liars and The Lying Game have both been turned into television series by ABC Family (now under the name of Freeform). The Pretty Little Liars series of novels is "loosely based on her experiences growing up in Chester County". The adaptation television series Pretty Little Liars lasted for seven seasons. Actresses Troian Bellisario, Ashley Benson, Shay Mitchell, and Lucy Hale star as the main characters Spencer Hastings, Hanna Marin, Emily Fields and Aria Montgomery. Shepard had a cameo on two episodes of the show: "The Homecoming Hangover", as a substitute teacher and "I'm a Good Girl, I Am", as the news reporter.

The Lying Game premiered on August 15, 2011 on ABC Family. Like the former, The Lying Game is also loosely based on the book series. ABC Family took an unusually long time to decide whether or not to renew The Lying Game beyond season 2, and the cast's contract options lapsed in April 2013 with only Alexandra Chando signing a new option. The network confirmed the cancellation of The Lying Game in July 2013, after Chando had announced the news on Twitter and Instagram. Chando starred as the main two characters Sutton Mercer and Emma Becker.

On September 25, 2017, it was announced that Shephard’s 2014 book series The Perfectionists would be loosely adapted into a television series, titled Pretty Little Liars: The Perfectionists, serving as a sequel to the television series Pretty Little Liars on Freeform. Sasha Pieterse and Janel Parrish have confirmed to reprise their original Pretty Little Liars roles as Alison DiLaurentis and Mona Vanderwaal. The series featured characters from The Perfectionists series played by actors Sofia Carson, Sydney Park, Eli Brown and Kelly Rutherford as Ava Jalali, Caitlin Martell-Lewis, Dylan Wright and Claire Hotchkiss, respectively. The series is cancelled after one season. On September 29, 2017, it was announced that Shepard's 2014 book The Heiresses would be adapted into a television series for ABC, with Shay Mitchell starring as Corrine Saybrook. As of 2018, the network has not move forward The Heiresses.

In May 2019, it was announced that Shepard would produce the anthology web series Crown Lake, which debuted on Brat on June 20, 2019. Shepard created a podcast series titled Cruise Ship, which was released by Meet Cute on July 6, 2021.

Bibliography

Young Adult

Pretty Little Liars 
 Pretty Little Liars (2006)
 Flawless (2007)
 Perfect (2007)
 Unbelievable (2008)
 Wicked (2008)
 Killer (2009)
 Heartless (2010)
 Wanted (2010)
 Twisted (2011)
 Ruthless (2011)
 Stunning (2012)
 Burned (2012)
 Crushed (2013)
 Deadly (2013)
 Toxic (2014)
 Vicious (2014)

 Companion novels
 Alison's Pretty Little Diary (2010)
 Pretty Little Secrets (2012)
 Ali's Pretty Little Lies (2013)
 Pretty Little Love (2017)
 Pretty Little Lost (2017)
 It's Not Easy Being "A" (2017)
 Pretty Little Liars: The Perfectionists (2019)
 Pretty Little Love: The Entire Journey (2020)

The Lying Game 
 The Lying Game (2010)
 Never Have I Ever (2011)
 Two Truths and a Lie (2012)
 Hide and Seek (2012)
 Cross My Heart, Hope to Die (2013)
 Seven Minutes in Heaven (2013)
 Companion novelas
 The First Lie (2012)
 True Lies (2013)

The Perfectionists 
 The Perfectionists (2014)
 The Good Girls (2015)

The Amateurs 
 The Amateurs (2016)
 Follow Me (2017)
 Last Seen (2018) 

Standalone
 Influence (January 5, 2021),

Adult fiction 
 The Visibles (May 5, 2009)
 Everything We Ever Wanted (October 10, 2011)
 The Heiresses (May 20, 2014)
 The Elizas (April 17, 2018)
 Reputation (December 3, 2019)
 Memory Lane (January 13, 2021) 
 Safe in My Arms (July 27, 2021)
 Wait for Me (November 1, 2022)

Filmography

Role credits

References

External links 
 
 

1977 births
21st-century American novelists
21st-century American women writers
American children's writers
Brooklyn College alumni
Living people
New York University alumni
Writers from Philadelphia
American writers of young adult literature
American people of Canadian descent
Writers from Pittsburgh
American women novelists
Women writers of young adult literature
People from Downingtown, Pennsylvania
Novelists from Pennsylvania